Potiapunga lata is a species of beetle in the family Cerambycidae and subfamily Lamiinae. It was described by Galileo and Martins in 2013. It is known to live in Bolivia.

References

Hemilophini
Beetles described in 2013